Koldan (also Romanized as Koldān; also known as Goldān) is a village in Javaran Rural District, Hanza District, Rabor County, Kerman Province, Iran. At the 2006 census, its population was 222, in 51 families.

References 

Populated places in Rabor County